The 2016 Russian Circuit Racing Series was the third season of the Russian Circuit Racing Series, organized by SMP Racing. It was the second season with TCR class cars, competing alongside the Super 2000 TC2 and the Super Production cars.

Teams and drivers
All teams and drivers were Russian-registered. Yokohama was the official tyre supplier.

Touring Absolute (United S2000)
 Are highlighted riders participating in TCR Russia.

Touring Light

National

Junior

Calendar and results
The 2016 schedule was announced on 11 November 2015, with all events scheduled to be held in Russia. Updated on 10 March. 21 July announced that due to the reconstruction of ADM Raceway stage 6 moved to Smolenskring.

Championship standings

† – Drivers did not finish the race, but were classified as they completed over 75% of the race distance.
The number of points after the deduction of the two worst results.

References

External links
 

Russian Circuit Racing Series
Russian Circuit Racing Series
Russian Circuit Racing Series